Torquato Tasso is a play in verse by the German dramatist Johann Wolfgang von Goethe about the sixteenth-century Italian poet and courtier Torquato Tasso and his descent into madness. The composition of the play began in Weimar in 1780 but most of it was written between 1786 and 1788, while Goethe was in Italy. He completed the play in 1790.

Notes

References
 Lamport, Francis John. 1990. German Classical Drama: Theatre, Humanity and Nation, 1750–1870. Cambridge: Cambridge University Press. .
Tasso

External links
 
English translation of Tasso

Plays by Johann Wolfgang von Goethe
1790 plays
Torquato Tasso
Plays set in Italy
Cultural depictions of poets
Cultural depictions of Italian men
Plays set in the 16th century
Mental health in fiction